Bangladesh Nazrul Sena has established the Nazrul Sena School, which is a well-known kindergarten school in Mymensingh. It was established in 1990, and is directly monitored by Bangladesh Nazrul Sena. G. E. M. Faruque, a key official of the organization, is the founder and the current principal of the school. The school has more than 200 students, 18 full-time teachers and 5 other staff members. Students of the school are always busy with their education and also involved in cultural activities like music, dance, drawing, sports, debating, speech and other social activities. The school started education using multimedia computer software for the first time in Myemsinghe and amongst the first in Bangladesh. Every year the school arranges picnics, study tours, annual sports, cultural competitions, annual prize-giving ceremony.

References
Bangladesh Nazrul Sena
Nazrul Sena School
Nazrul Sena School in Facebook
Kazi Nazrul Islam

Educational institutions established in 1990
Education in Bangladesh
1990 establishments in Bangladesh